Ice Cream Castle is a 1984 album by The Time. Similar to their previous two albums, this album consists of six tracks in the funk-pop or ballad genre, and it was produced and arranged by Prince as "The Starr ★ Company".

The album's two biggest hits, "Jungle Love" and "The Bird", were featured in the film Purple Rain and this, along with Day's performance in the movie, catapulted the album up the charts and to a crossover audience. The band didn't have time to enjoy the success, as they had disbanded by the time the movie was released.

Ice Cream Castle produced three singles: "Ice Cream Castles", "Jungle Love", and "The Bird".

Recording
Sessions for the album began in late March 1983, at Sunset Sound, in Hollywood (while Prince and The Time were still on the 1999 Tour), beginning with "Jungle Love." "Chili Sauce" (under its original title, "Proposition #17") and "If The Kid Can't Make You Come" followed in mid-April 1983.  Although Prince played the majority of the studio instrumentation on the album, members of The Time, particularly Jesse Johnson, made some contributions.

"The Bird" was recorded live by the band in early October 1983 at First Avenue in Minneapolis, after a studio recording was made earlier in 1983, but the live version was chosen for release instead. "Ice Cream Castles" and "My Drawers" were the final tracks recorded for the album in mid-January 1984.

Other tracks recorded and considered for the album included "My Summertime Thang" (recorded in late March 1983, and later released on The Time's fourth album Pandemonium). "Cloreen Baconskin" was recorded during the same two-day session in late March 1983, with Morris Day on drums, but isn't believed to have been intended for the album.

Later tracks considered for the album include "Chocolate" (released on Pandemonium), "My Love Belongs to You" and "Velvet Kitty Cat" (released on the deluxe edition of Purple Rain), all recorded in mid-April 1983.

Commercial performance
The album peaked at number 24 on the Billboard 200 and number three on the Top Soul LPs charts. The album spent a total of 57 weeks on the US Billboard album charts and had reached its peak position in early March 1985. The album was eventually certified platinum by the Recording Industry Association of America (RIAA) for sales of over a million copies in the United States. This remains the group's best selling album to date.

Track listing
Note that the original label gave writing credits to Morris Day (or Morris Day and Jesse Johnson) for all six songs.  However, the songs were officially registered with ASCAP as being written by Prince, or by Prince and Morris Day, which is from where the official writing credits have been sourced.

Singles
"Ice Cream Castles" (#11 R&B, #106 Pop)
"Ice Cream Castles"
"Tricky" (non-album track)
"Get It Up" – 12" single

"Jungle Love" (#6 R&B, #20 Pop)
"Jungle Love"
"Oh, Baby" – 7" single
"Tricky" (non-album track) – NL 7" single, German 12" single
"The Bird" – 7" back-to-back single

"The Bird" (#33 R&B, #36 Pop)
"The Bird"
"My Drawers"

Personnel
Morris Day - lead vocals, background vocals, drums on My Drawers
Prince - all background vocals and instruments, except where noted (uncredited) on Ice Cream Castles, My Drawers, Chili Sauce, Jungle Love and If The Kid Can’t Make You Come
Jesse Johnson - vocals and guitar, guitar solo on My Drawers, drums on If The Kid Can’t Make You Come
Sharon Hughes - dialog on Chili Sauce, background vocals on If The Kid Can’t Make You Come
Novi Novog - violin on Chili Sauce
Mark Cardenas - background vocals and keyboards on The Bird
Paul Peterson - background vocals and keyboards on The Bird
Jerry Hubbard - bass guitar and vocals on The Bird
Jellybean Johnson - drums on The Bird
Jerome Benton - percussion and voice on The Bird
Jill Jones - background vocals on If The Kid Can’t Make You Come (uncredited)
David Leonard - engineer
Peggy McCreary - engineer
Terry Christian - engineer
Bernie Grundman - mastering

Charts

Weekly charts

Year-end charts

Certifications

References

External links
"Ice Cream Castle" at discogs

The Time (band) albums
1984 albums
Warner Records albums
Albums produced by Prince (musician)
Albums recorded at Sunset Sound Recorders